Cho Young-cheol (Hangul: 조영철; born 31 May 1989) is a South Korean football striker who currently plays for FC Tiamo Hirakata.

International career
Cho was a member of the South Korean team for the 2008 Summer Olympics in China. The following year, he represented South Korea U20 at the 2009 FIFA U-20 World Cup.

On 11 August 2010, Cho made his first appearance for the Korean senior team in a 2–1 defeat of Nigeria. He was included in South Korea's squad for 2015 AFC Asian Cup and scored his first senior international goal in the team's opening match against Oman.

Statistics

Club statistics
As of 10 July 2014

International goals
 Results list South Korea's goal tally first.

Personal life
He can speak Japanese fluently. His blog is written in Japanese.

References

External links
 チョ・ヨンチョルオフィシャルブログ「ヨンチョルBLOG」Powered by Ameba - His Blog
 
 
 
 
 

1989 births
Living people
Association football forwards
South Korean footballers
South Korea international footballers
South Korean expatriate footballers
Yokohama FC players
Albirex Niigata players
Omiya Ardija players
Qatar SC players
Ulsan Hyundai FC players
Gimcheon Sangmu FC players
J1 League players
J2 League players
Qatar Stars League players
Expatriate footballers in Japan
Expatriate footballers in Qatar
South Korean expatriate sportspeople in Japan
South Korean expatriate sportspeople in Qatar
Footballers at the 2008 Summer Olympics
Olympic footballers of South Korea
2015 AFC Asian Cup players
Asian Games medalists in football
Footballers at the 2010 Asian Games
Asian Games bronze medalists for South Korea
Sportspeople from Ulsan
Medalists at the 2010 Asian Games